Look What the Cat Dragged In is the debut studio album by American glam metal band Poison, released on May 23, 1986 through Enigma Records. Though not a success at first, it steadily built momentum and peaked at #3 on the US Billboard 200 on May 23, 1987. The album spawned three successful singles: "Talk Dirty to Me", "I Want Action", and "I Won't Forget You".

Look What the Cat Dragged In was certified gold in 1987 and 3x multi-platinum in 1990 by the RIAA. It has also been certified silver by the BPI, and platinum in Canada.

Production and marketing
The record was described by vocalist Bret Michaels as a "glorified demo". It was recorded in twelve days at Los Angeles' Music Grinder Studios with producer Ric Browde, for a cost of US $23,000, part of which was funded from the pockets of the band members and their families.

Background
It originally included only one single, "Cry Tough"; however, Look What the Cat Dragged In became a surprise success and subsequently spawned three more charting hits: "Talk Dirty to Me", "I Want Action", and "I Won't Forget You", The record became the biggest-selling-album in Enigma's history. With heavy rotation on MTV, their debut earned the band tours with fellow glam rockers Ratt, Cinderella, and Quiet Riot, as well as a coveted slot in the Texxas Jam in Dallas. The album ultimately sold 4 million copies worldwide.

Reissues
In 2006, a 20th Anniversary edition was released by Capitol, with the original title. This version added single versions of two of the album's tracks and a cover of Jim Croce's "You Don't Mess Around with Jim" as bonus tracks.

Track listing

Personnel
Bret Michaels – lead vocals, rhythm guitar
C.C. DeVille – lead guitar, backing vocals
Bobby Dall – bass, backing vocals
Rikki Rockett – drums, backing vocals

Additional personnel
Ric Browde – arrangement, production
Jim Faraci – engineering, production
Michael Wagener – mixing

Charts

Certifications

Accolades

References

External links
Interview with Bret Michaels at Classic Rock Revisited

Poison (American band) albums
1986 debut albums
Enigma Records albums